is a sub-kilometer trinary asteroid, classified as near-Earth object and potentially hazardous asteroid of the Apollo group.

Discovery 

 was discovered by Spacewatch's Jim Scotti at Kitt Peak National Observatory on 3 February 1994. In June 2009 it was shown to be a triple system, i.e. the largest body is orbited by two satellites; only about one percent (1%) of near-Earth asteroids observed by a radar are found to be triple systems such as this one.

Observations 

A team of NASA's Jet Propulsion Laboratory (JPL) (Pasadena, California) scientists led by Marina Brozovic and Lance Benner, made the discovery using radar imaging at NASA's Goldstone Solar System Radar on June 12 and June 14, 2009. They showed that the near-Earth asteroid  is a triple system, which encountered Earth within 2.52 million kilometers on June 10, 2009. This relatively close approach to Earth made the discovery possible, as before the approach, scientists knew very little about this asteroid. In fact,  is only the second triple system known in the near-Earth objects population.

1994 CC consists of a central object about 700 meters in diameter that has two moons revolving around it. Scientists' preliminary analysis of the system suggests that the moons are at least 50 meters in diameter. In a similar study, the radar observations at Arecibo Observatory in Puerto Rico, led by the Mike Nolan, also confirmed the detection of all three objects. The scientists plan to use the combined observations from the Goldstone and Arecibo observatories to study 's orbital and physical properties further.

The next similar Earth flyby for the asteroid  will happen in 2074 when the triple system is projected to fly past Earth at a distance of 2.5 million kilometers.

Orbital characteristics of satellites 

The orbital properties of the satellites are listed in this table. The orbital planes of both satellites are inclined relative to each other, by approximately 16°. Such a large inclination is suggestive of past evolutionary events (e.g. close encounter with a terrestrial planet, mean-motion resonance crossing) that may have excited their orbits from a coplanar configuration to an inclined state.

Numbering and naming 

This minor planet was numbered by the Minor Planet Center on 5 December 2006. , it has not been named.

See also 
 List of exceptional asteroids
 2004 FH
 87 Sylvia
 433 Eros

References

External links 
 Spacewatch Discoveries for 1994, Spacewatch NEO Detections by Year, University of Arizona
 Official press release by NASA on triplet system
 (136617) 1994 CC compiled by Wm. Robert Johnston
 Julia Fang, "Orbits of Near-Earth Asteroid Triples 2001 SN263 and 1994 CC: Properties, Origin, and Evolution", 
 
 
 

136617
136617
136617
136617
19940203
20090610
19940203